Sher Dhan Rai (born 23 February 1971) is a Nepalese politician and Former Chief Minister of Province No. 1, a province in eastern Nepal. He was elected parliamentary party leader of CPN (UML), the largest party in the provincial assembly, on 9 February 2018. Rai was subsequently appointed chief minister on 14 February 2018. He was previously elected to the 2nd Nepalese Constituent Assembly, winning the Bhojpur–2 seat for the Communist Party of Nepal (Unified Marxist–Leninist). Rai also served as a cabinet minister in the Government of Nepal, and was appointed Minister of Information and Communications in the first Oli cabinet.

Personal life
Rai was born in Pasalbhanjyang, Thidingkha, Bhojpur in eastern Nepal in a farming family to Jagir Man Rai and Ramri Maya Rai. His father was elected thrice as village chief during the Panchayat period, and for two more terms after the Panchayat system was replaced by multi-party democracy. Rai has a post-graduate degree in Sociology.

He married Jangmu Sherpa on 24 January, 2021.

References

External links

Living people
Communist Party of Nepal (Unified Marxist–Leninist) politicians
1971 births
People from Bhojpur District, Nepal
Chief Ministers of Nepalese provinces
Members of the Provincial Assembly of Koshi Province
Nepal MPs 1999–2002
Rai people
Members of the 2nd Nepalese Constituent Assembly